Eric Genrich (born October 8, 1979) is an American politician who has served as the mayor of Green Bay, Wisconsin, since 2019. Genrich previously represented Green Bay in the Wisconsin State Assembly from 2013 until 2019.

Early life and education

Born in Green Bay, Wisconsin, Genrich graduated from Notre Dame Academy in 1998. He went on to attend the University of Wisconsin–Madison, where he majored in history and sociology, earning his bachelor's degree in 2002. He earned a Master of Library and Information Science from the University of Wisconsin–Milwaukee in 2010.

Career 
After graduating from the University of Wisconsin, Genrich was employed for six years as a legislative aide to State Senator Dave Hansen. He was subsequently employed as a district representative for Congressman Steve Kagen. After Kagen left office in 2011, Genrich was employed as an IT librarian at the Brown County Library, where he worked until his election to the Assembly in 2012.

Wisconsin Legislature 
The 2011 Wisconsin gerrymander (2011 Wisc. Act 43) significantly altered the political makeup of the Wisconsin's 90th Assembly district, removing suburban Howard and Suamico, and packing in more of Green Bay's population. In March 2012, 90th district incumbent State Representative Karl Van Roy announced he would not seek re-election in the new district, Genrich announced his candidacy for the seat a month later.

Genrich would defeat Republican activist and businessman David VanderLeest in the 2012 general election, taking 60.2% of the vote. He was subsequently re-elected in 2014, defeating attorney Eric Wimberger, and was unopposed in 2016.

Genrich, as a Democrat, served in the minority during his six years in the Wisconsin State Assembly. He was a member of the committees on education, on energy and utilities, on insurance, on regulatory licensing reform, and on science and technology.

Mayor of Green Bay 
In March 2018, he announced his candidacy for mayor of Green Bay in the 2019 election, in a bid to replace Jim Schmitt, who was not seeking another term as mayor. Genrich and Brown County Supervisor Patrick Buckley advanced from a primary election, and Genrich defeated Buckley with 57.1% of the vote.

During the COVID-19 pandemic Mayor Genrich was one of several Wisconsin mayors and politicians who sought alternative voting accommodations to comply with COVID-19 lockdown procedures. Genrich and the city of Green Bay filed a lawsuit in the United States District Court for the Eastern District of Wisconsin about two weeks before the April 7 elections, stating that they did not have the capacity to carry out the election as directed, and asking for an injunction to delay the election until June. The suit was quickly dismissed by the court, which said it lacked jurisdiction to rule on the matter. A subsequent order from Wisconsin Governor Tony Evers to postpone the election also fell in the Wisconsin Supreme Court. The election went forward as scheduled on April 7, though with less than 10% of their normal election workers. Brown County Clerk Sandy Juno offered to allocate Wisconsin National Guard personnel to manage polling stations, but Green Bay (along with other neighboring municipalities) refused, citing a lack of training. As a result of the personnel shortages, Green Bay could operate only 2 of their 31 in-person polling locations and endured long lines of voters waiting to cast their ballots.

Personal life 
Mayor Genrich and his wife, Emily (née Kelley), live on Green Bay's east side with their two children.

Electoral history

Wisconsin Assembly (2012, 2014, 2016)

| colspan="6" style="text-align:center;background-color: #e9e9e9;"| General Election, November 6, 2012

| colspan="6" style="text-align:center;background-color: #e9e9e9;"| General Election, November 4, 2014

Green Bay Mayor (2019)

| colspan="6" style="text-align:center;background-color: #e9e9e9;"| Nonpartisan Primary, February 19, 2019 (top-two)

| colspan="6" style="text-align:center;background-color: #e9e9e9;"| General Election, April 2, 2019

References

External links
 Campaign website
 
 About the Mayor at Green Bay, Wisconsin
 Representative Eric Genrich at Wisconsin Legislature
 State Representative Eric Genrich (Archived October 31, 2018)

1979 births
Living people
Mayors of Green Bay, Wisconsin
University of Wisconsin–Madison College of Letters and Science alumni
University of Wisconsin–Milwaukee alumni
Democratic Party members of the Wisconsin State Assembly
21st-century American politicians
Notre Dame Academy (Green Bay, Wisconsin) alumni